Senator Tarver may refer to:

Ed Tarver (born 1959), Georgia State Senate
Gregory Tarver (born 1946), Louisiana State Senate